Alfred Jackson (14 January 1896 – 13 February 1980) was a British boxer. He competed in the men's light heavyweight event at the 1928 Summer Olympics. In his first fight, he defeated Alf Cleverley of New Zealand, before losing to Karel Miljon of the Netherlands.

Jackson won the Amateur Boxing Association 1927 and 1928 light heavyweight title, when boxing out of the St. Pancras ABC.

References

External links
 

1896 births
1980 deaths
British male boxers
Olympic boxers of Great Britain
Boxers at the 1928 Summer Olympics
Boxers from Greater London
Light-heavyweight boxers